Ahiron Radjae (born 12 March 1943) is a Filipino former swimmer. He competed in the men's 200 metre butterfly at the 1960 Summer Olympics.

References

1943 births
Living people
Filipino male swimmers
Olympic swimmers of the Philippines
Swimmers at the 1960 Summer Olympics
Swimmers at the 1962 Asian Games
Asian Games competitors for the Philippines
Male butterfly swimmers
21st-century Filipino people
20th-century Filipino people